This is a list of roads designated M18. Road entries are sorted in the countries alphabetical order.

 M-18 road (Bosnia and Herzegovina) a road connecting Sarajevo, Trnovo, Foča and Trebinje
 M18 motorway (Great Britain), a road connecting Rotherham and Goole in Yorkshire, England
 M18 motorway (Ireland), a road connecting junction 9 on the Shannon bypass in County Clare and Gort in County Galway
 M-18 (Michigan highway), a road connecting US 10 near North Bradley and M-72 near Luzerne 
 M18 highway (Russia), a road connecting Saint Petersburg and Murmansk
 Highway M18 (Ukraine), a road connecting Yalta and Kharkiv
 M18 (East London), a Metropolitan Route in East London, South Africa
 M18 (Cape Town), a Metropolitan Route in Cape Town, South Africa
 M18 (Johannesburg), a Metropolitan Route in Johannesburg, South Africa
 M18 (Pretoria), a Metropolitan Route in Pretoria, South Africa
 M18 (Port Elizabeth), a Metropolitan Route in Port Elizabeth, South Africa
M18 Road (Zambia), a road in Zambia

See also
 List of highways numbered 18